s.Oliver Arena (originally known as Carl-Diem-Halle until 2004 due to namesake Carl Diem and his close relations to Nazism) is a multi-purpose indoor arena located in Würzburg, Germany. The arena opened in 1981 and has a capacity of 4,756 people. Its primary tenants are the s.Oliver Würzburg, a professional basketball team.

References

Indoor arenas in Germany